Henry Ohayon (born 17 June 1934) is an Israeli cyclist. He competed in the individual road race at the 1960 Summer Olympics.

References

External links
 

1934 births
Living people
Moroccan emigrants to Israel
Israeli male cyclists
Olympic cyclists of Israel
Cyclists at the 1960 Summer Olympics